Veritair Aviation Limited is a helicopter charter company based at Cardiff Heliport, in Cardiff, Wales.  It operates year-round charter and contract helicopter services throughout United Kingdom and Europe. Veritair Aviation has major contracts with the BBC for measurement of transmitting antenna radiation patterns throughout the UK and further afield, QinetiQ for recovering MOD targets offshore and provides a British Transport Police helicopter to patrol and secure railway lines throughout the UK.
 
Veritair Aviation was created following a management buyout in 2008 of Veritair from British International Helicopters led by Captain Julian Verity. Veritair Aviation holds a United Kingdom Civil Aviation Authority Air Operator Certificate, which permits it to carry passengers for public air transportation.

History 
Veritair was founded by Julian Verity, its present managing director, in 1982 based at Cardiff Wales Airport operating a solitary Bell Jetranger helicopter.   TV and Broadcasters were and remain major users of the company's services both home and abroad.   The company quickly expanded with 2 Bell helicopters and in 1985 moved “downtown” into the first Cardiff Heliport, opened by Jim Callahan MP.  Branching into both police, BBC and MoD work in the 1990s saw the Company grow and diversify.

Veritair operates both single and twin-engine helicopters and now occupies the new £4m Cardiff Heliport opened in 2000 by HRH Prince of Wales in Cardiff Bay.  Veritair's progress has seen its ownership change hands several times over the past 27 years but its name, management and Welsh identity has remained throughout.

Previous owners include significant world-class helicopter operators including CHC Helicopter Corporation and more recently British International Helicopters (whose roots go back to British Airways Helicopters).

Fleet 
The Veritair Aviation fleet consists of the following aircraft:

 1 x MBB BK117C1
 1 x Aerospatiale AS355N Twin Squirrel
 1 x MBB Bo 105Db4

Destinations 
 Cardiff Heliport

See also
 List of defunct airlines of the United Kingdom

References

External links
Main Company Information

Economy of Cardiff
Companies based in Cardiff
Defunct airlines of the United Kingdom